Eye on Juliet is a Canadian drama film, directed by Kim Nguyen and released in 2017. The film had its world premiere in the Venice Days program of the 74th Venice International Film Festival, and its North American premiere at the 2017 Toronto International Film Festival.

The film stars Joe Cole as Gordon, an oil pipeline supervisor who works through a robotic hexapod. Gordon's job is complicated when he becomes fascinated by Ayusha (Lina El Arabi), a young woman he glimpses one day through the drone's camera.

Plot
Gordon works for an American security surveillance company monitoring threats to their client's oil facility in an unnamed North-African country, using dozens of hexapods, which also have the ability to shoot, to cover a large area of arid desert.

Gordon has recently broken up with his girlfriend and is resisting his colleague's attempts to persuade him to "play the field". One day at work, Gordon sees on  his cameras a young woman, Ayusha (Lina El Arabi), who resembles his girlfriend, who it transpires is trapped in an arranged marriage and unable to marry her true love, Karim (Faycal zeglat). As Ayusha's family make preparations for the wedding, Gordon becomes infatuated by the illicit couple's love, and Ayusha in particular, and steals pictures of the couple and their movements for his home. He observes Ayusha undressing in her room via heat-seeking camera, and witnesses them discussing the logistics of eloping together, which would require Karim to join a potentially illicit project to raise funds. Ignoring the warnings of his supervisor, Peter, Gordon becomes more involved in their lives, drugging Peter while on shift in order to operate freely, and sending the couple money for their emigration.

Gordon subsequently observes Karim and his associate tampering with the pipeline. In the ensuing events the oil catches fire, leading to Karim's death. Gordon informs Ayusha of Karim's death via one of the hexapods, and fictionalises the final moments of Karim's life to gain her trust. He informs her of the money he sent her and convinces her to collect it from the bank and escape from her family. Meanwhile Peter has recovered from being drugged and confronts Gordon over his bizarre actions. Gordon somehow convinces Peter to jeopardise his own job and allow Gordon time to facilitate Ayusha's escape. However, when she returns home her family have been informed of her suspicious behaviour and lock her in her room. Gordon sends a hexapod to her home to break her out and they travel together to Ayusha's point of collection. Gordon informs Ayusha that she may have more than one soulmate, and that observing someone like her who is capable of really loving someone has made him happy. He also predicts that she might find another man, and then makes her promise to meet him in Paris at exactly the same time the following year.

The following year in Paris, they meet and it is implied that they will embark on a romance.

References

External links
 

2017 films
Canadian drama films
English-language Canadian films
Films directed by Kim Nguyen
Films shot in Morocco
Arabic-language Canadian films
2017 drama films
2010s Canadian films